Lepa Rada district, with headquarters at Basar, is one of the 25 districts of Arunachal Pradesh state in northeastern India. Lepa Rada falls under 29-Basar Assembly Constituency and 1-West Parliamentary Constituency. The district is centrally located, hence the name Lepa Rada (Lepa means centre and Rada means bulls-eye like in Archery). Basar, Tirbin, Dari and Sago are 4 administrative circles of the district.  It was created from the West Siang district by bifurcating its southern areas along Assam border into a new district.

History
The district was created in 2018 by bifurcating the Lower Siang district.

Demographics 
At the time of the 2011 census, Lepa Rada district had a population of 14,490. Scheduled Tribes made up 11,235 (77.54%).

At the time of the 2011 census, 71.81% of the population spoke Galo, 4.72% Nepali, 3.78% Bengali, 3.60% Adi, 3.27% Hindi, 2.74% Bhojpuri, 2.67% Assamese and 1.08% Boro as their first language.

Culture
People

Lepa Rada is inhabited by the Galo tribe. Mopin being the main festival of harvest.

See also 
 List of districts of Arunachal Pradesh

References

External links
 Official website

Districts of Arunachal Pradesh